Wild Horses is the debut studio album by the British rock band, Wild Horses, co-produced with Trevor Rabin at Konk Studios in London, and released on 14 April 1980 on EMI Records. It peaked at No. 38, and spent four weeks in the UK Albums Chart.

It was subsequently issued on CD in Japan in 1993 on Toshiba-EMI, and by the now defunct UK labels Zoom Club in 1999 and Krescendo Records in 2009, respectively, both with the title The First Album. The most recent re-issue came in February 2013, courtesy of UK-based Rock Candy Records, and includes a host of unreleased studios demos as bonus tracks not found on previous re-issues.

Track listing
All songs by Jimmy Bain and Brian Robertson, except where noted
Side one
"Reservation" - 3:47
"Face Down" - 3:30
"Blackmail" - 2:25
"Flyaway" (Bain, Phil Lynott) - 3:33
"Dealer" (Bain, Robertson, Scott Gorham) - 4:56

Side two
"Street Girl" - 3:28
"No Strings Attached" - 3:56
"Criminal Tendencies" - 3:46
"Nights on the Town" - 3:21
"Woman" - 4:01

Zoom Club re-issue bonus tracks
"Rocky Mountain Way" (Joe Walsh, Joe Vitale, Rocke Grace, Kenny Passarelli) - 4:33 (live in Osaka, Japan)
"Saturday Night" (Eddie Floyd, Steve Cropper) - 7:20 (live in Osaka, Japan)

Krescendo re-issue bonus tracks
"The Axe" (live from BBC 'In Concert', 1981)
"In the City" (live from BBC 'In Concert', 1981) 
"New York City" (live from BBC 'In Concert', 1981)

Rock Candy re-issue bonus tracks
"The Rapist"  - 3:37 (B-side of "Criminal Tendencies" single)
"Reservation" (demo) - 4:22
"Blackmail" (demo) - 2:41
"Flyaway" (demo) - 3:12 (featuring Phil Lynott)
"Dealer" (demo) - 4:49
"The Rapist" (demo) - 3:38
"Retribution" (demo) - 5:22
"Breathe on Me" (demo) - 5:51

Personnel
Wild Horses
Brian Robertson - lead guitars, backing and lead (3, 9) vocals, bass (4, 9), arrangements
Neil Carter - lead guitars, backing vocals, keyboards
Jimmy Bain - bass (1-3, 5-8, 10), lead vocals (1, 2, 4-8, 10), rhythm guitars, keyboards, arrangements
Clive Edwards - drums

Production
Trevor Rabin - producer
John Rollo - engineer

Release history

References

1980 debut albums
Wild Horses (British band) albums
albums produced by Trevor Rabin
EMI Records albums